Monica Heldal (born 24 January 1991 in Bergen, Norway) is a Norwegian musician (vocals, guitar) and songwriter. Her debut studio album, Boy From the North, was released on 4 November 2013. For the album she received two awards during Spellemannprisen in 2013: Rookie of the Year and Best Pop Solo Artist. She also won the Bendiksenprisen in 2013 and was nominated for the Statoil Scholarship that same year.

Early life and career 
Monica Heldal was born in Arna, Norway, on 24 January 1991. At 16, she began to play and compose music, writing the song "Silly Willy", which was later included in her studio debut.

Style and influences 
Heldal's musical style draws from many different musical genres, primarily folk and blues. The latter is inspired by her main influence, Rory Gallagher. She is well known for her use of fingerpicking technique and various complex guitar tunings, much like one of her other sources of inspiration, Nick Drake.

Awards 
 Rookie of the Year (2013), Spellemannprisen
 Best Pop Solo Artist (2013), Spellemannprisen
 Bendiksenprisen (2013)

Discography 
 Boy From the North (2013)
 The One in the Sun (2016)
Ravensdale (2021)

References

External links 
Official Site

1991 births
Living people
Spellemannprisen winners
Norwegian singer-songwriters
Norwegian songwriters
Norwegian blues singers
Norwegian blues guitarists
English-language singers from Norway
Musicians from Bergen
21st-century Norwegian singers
21st-century Norwegian women singers